Shockproof is a 1949 American crime film noir directed by Douglas Sirk and starring Patricia Knight and Cornel Wilde. Wilde and Knight were husband and wife during filming. They divorced in 1951.

Plot
Griff Marat (Cornel Wilde), is a parole officer who falls in love with a parolee, Jenny Marsh (Patricia Knight). Marsh had gone to prison in order to protect Harry Wesson (John Baragrey) a gambler with whom she was having an affair.

Warned to steer clear of Harry permanently, Jenny disobeys, still feeling loyal to him. A raid on Harry's bookie joint while Jenny is there costs her the job Griff has found for her.  Out of concern for her welfare, Griff hires Jenny as a caretaker for his blind mother (Esther Minciotti).

Griff has political ambitions that Harry would like to ruin, so, knowing it is against regulations for the parolee and parole officer to be involved, Harry encourages Jenny to accept Griff's romantic advances.  Jenny knows the regulations too, but realizes she loves Griff and they get married; she makes one more trip to speak to Harry, to tell him that she truly loves Griff. During their conversation, Harry threatens to reveal letters she had written him, in which she expressed her love. Jenny points Harry's own gun at him and, after a brief struggle, he ends up shot and seriously wounded. Griff and Jenny attempt to flee to Mexico. This fails but, willing to do anything to keep his wife from going back to jail, Griff takes a job in an oil refinery.  Their photographs regularly appear in newspapers, but the last straw for Jenny is when a paper which includes their pictures is delivered to every neighbor in their refinery community. The couple decide to go back and turn themselves in. When the police take them to Harry in the hospital, he clears Jenny's name by swearing that the shooting was an accident.

Cast
 Cornel Wilde as Griff Marat
 Patricia Knight as Jenny Marsh
 John Baragrey as Harry Wesson
 Esther Minciotti as Mrs. Marat
 Howard St. John as Sam Brooks
 Russell Collins as Frederick Bauer
 Charles Bates as Tommy Marat
 Gilbert Barnett as Barry (uncredited)

Background
The director of Shockproof, Douglas Sirk, said he took the assignment because the film dealt with one of his favorite themes: the price of flouting taboos.

In Samuel Fuller's original script, the film ended with a violent rebellion by Marat against the system that kept him and Marsh apart. The studio had National Velvet scriptwriter Helen Deutsch step in to pen a soft-suds rewrite.

A number of Fuller's screenplays, including The Naked Kiss, The Baron of Arizona, House of Bamboo, Forty Guns, The Big Red One and this film, featured a lead character called Griff.

Reception
A New York Times writer, Matt Zoller Seitz, discussed the significance of "Shockproof" in 2007 when the film received its first theatrical showing in New York City: "...while Shockproof will inspire more groans than gasps, it's essential viewing for fans of Mr. Fuller and Mr. Sirk — and that's why the Two Boots Pioneer Theater and an online film discussion group teamed up to give this critically and financially unsuccessful movie its first New York run.  The lurid setup and obsessive-loner-versus-the-system mechanics are pure Samuel Fuller. Mr. Sirk's personality is expressed in the film's affection for its screwed-up characters, in the poetic deployment of mirrors, windows and stairways, and in the low-angled wide shots of Griff's house, a space that seems both nurturing and oppressive."

Trivia 
The British serial killer John Straffen committed a murder on the way to see Shockproof at the cinema in 1951.

References

External links
 
 
 
 

1949 films
1949 crime drama films
American black-and-white films
American crime drama films
Columbia Pictures films
Film noir
Films scored by George Duning
Films directed by Douglas Sirk
1940s English-language films
1940s American films